Himalayan Institute of Technology -  HIT Dehradun is a College located in Dehradun, Uttarakhand. It was established in 2001 and is affiliated to HNBG Central University & SDSU State University for Bachelor of Hotel Management, BBA, BCA, BSc Agriculture, BSc Forestry, BSc-IT, BCom, MSc-IT, MCom, MSc Agronomy, and other courses and degrees. The motto of HIT Dehradun is "Learning Today, Leading Tomorrow".

History 
Himalayan Institute of Technology – HIT Dehradun was established in 2001 with a vision of quality education to all. Initially, the college had its campus at Haridwar Road, Dehradun. Presently, HIT Dehradun has two campuses - the old campus at Haridwar Road, Dehradun, and the new campus at Asthal, Dehradun.

Recognition and Accreditation 

 Affiliated to HNBG Central University
 Sri Dev Suman University
 Approved by UGC
 Approved by Ministry of HRD, Government of India
 Recognised by Government of Uttarakhand.

Admission 
Admissions in HIT Dehradun in all the courses are on the basis of merit.

Facilities 
The Institute has a scenic campus in the foothills of the Himalayas with wifi, Well stocked library, Hostel Facilities, Sports Facilities, Practical Labs,  Transport Facility, etc.

Academics 
HIT Dehradun is conducting 15 courses from Central University and state university under 6 departments

 Department of Hotel Management
 Department of Agricultural science
 Department of IT & Computer Sciences
 Department of Management
 Department of Commerce
 Department of Applied Sciences

List of Courses 

 Bachelor of Hotel Management
 BSc Agriculture
 BSc Forestry
 BBA
 BCA
 BSc- IT
 B Com
 B Com Hons.
 BSc – Biotechnology
 BSc- PCM/ ZBC
 MSc –IT
 MCom
 MSc Agronomy
 MSc Soil Science
 MSc Genetic & Plant Breeding

Placement 
HIT Dehradun- Himalayan Institute of Technology has a dedicated Training and Placement Cell to guide students to choose the right career.

References 

Universities and colleges in Dehradun
 
2001 establishments in Uttarakhand
Educational institutions established in 2001